Sabitha Anand is an Indian actress who has performed in Tamil and Malayalam movies and serials. She was one of the lead actresses in the 1980s. She is the daughter of Jacoob Abdu Rahman Anand, an Indian actor in Malayalam movies during the 1960s and 70s.

Career
She made her debut through Uppu in 1987. She has acted as the lead female cast alongside popular male counterparts such as Mammotty, Mohanlal, Ratheesh. She has acted in more than 100 Malayalam films.  Later went on to supporting roles and Mother character roles and shifted her focus to Tamil Cinema. She is currently concentrating on Tamil serials.

Selected filmography

Malayalam

 1975 Mattoru Seetha 
 1981 Sapthapadi
 1982 Aasha as Rasiya
 1982 Ayudham as Oppana dancer
 1982 Ponnum Poovum as Woman in the car
 1982 Thadakam as Madhavi
 1982 Innallenkil Naale
 1983 Aaroodam as Malootty
 1983 Yudham as Radha
 1983 Aashrayam as Teacher
 1983 Ee Yugam
 1983 Mortuary
 1984 Unaroo as Mary
 1984 Muthodu Muthu as Sulochana
 1984 Ente Upasana as Nisha
 1984 Karimbu as Rejina
 1984 Aksharangal as Nalini
 1984 Chakkarayumma as Asha Thomas
 1984 Sandarbham as Usha
 1984 Ente Kalithozhan 
 1984 Shabadham as Seetha
 1984 Kanamarayathu as Mercy
 1984 Athirathram 
 1984 Ariyaatha Veethikal as Ambili
 1984 Oru Kochu Swapnam as Maggie
 1984 Arante Mulla Kochu Mulla as Kavitha
 1985 Guerrilla
 1985 Parannuyaran
 1985 Maanyamahaajanangale as Suhra
 1985 Koodiyaattam
 1985 Kaattuthee
 1985 Shaantham Bheekaram
 1985 Angadikkappurathu as Sainaba
 1985 Principal Olivil as Sreedevi
 1985 Scene No 7 as Ammini
 1985 Nullinovikkathe
 1985 Vellarikka Pattanam as Shobha 
 1985 Kaiyum Thalayum Purathidaruthu as Singer
 1986 Atham Chithira Chothi as Lily
 1986 Kaveri as Elizabeth
 1986 Ente Sabdham as Laila
 1986 Love Story as  Savithri
 1986 Njan Kathorthirikkum as Jameela
 1987 Uppu
 1987 Janagalude Sradhakku
 1987 Naalkkavala as Leela
 1987 Kaanan Kothichu
 1987 Kilipattu 
 1987 Yaagagni as Raasi
 1987 Manja Manthrangal as Lucie
 1987 Ithrayum Kalam as Sainaba
 1988 Loose Loose Arappiri Loose as Shalini
 1988 Ormayil Ennum as Stella
 1988 1921 as Ammukutty
 1988 Mrithyunjayam as Jessy
 1988 Bheekaran as Teacher
 1988 Dhwani as Kanakam
 1989 Ulsavapittennu as Indira
 1989 Chanakyan as Jessy
 1989 Njangalude Kochu Doctor 
 1990 Orukkam
 1990 Prosecution
 1990 Commander
 1990 Kalikkalam as Suhra
 1991 Kadalorakkaattu as Ponnappan's wife
 1991 Parallel College as Radha
 1991 Bhoomika as Sarada
 1994 Sagaram Sakshi
 1994 Chukkan as Sindhu
 1994 Vidheyan as Omana
 1995 Aavarthanam
 1996 Kumkumacheppu as Devi
 1999 Paava
 2001 Ee Parakkum Thalika as Lakshmi
 2001 Kinavu Pole
 2002 Aasradyam Parayum
 2003 Chronic Bachelor as Saraswathi
 2003 Relax
 2004 Yaanam
 2007 Vinodayathra as Anupama's Mother
 2008 Maya Bazar  as Maya's mother
 2008 Cycle as Gowri
 2008 Parunthu as Purushu's Mother
 2011 Aazhakadal as Rosanna
 2013 Annayum Rasoolum
 2013 Thira
 2013 :72 Model as Saraswathy
 2014 :Homely Meals as Alan's mother
 2016 :Girls as Sophia's mother
 2018 :Njan Prakashan as Prakashan's mother
 2021 :Kaalchilambu

Tamil

 1982 Gopurangal Saivathillai
 1982 Ninaivellam Nithya
 1985 Hemavin Kadhalargal
 1986 Kaidhiyin Theerpu
 1987 Thaye Neeye Thunai
 1987 Chinna Poove Mella Pesu as Esther
 1988 Pattikaatu Thambi
 1988 Ennai Vittu Pogaathe
 1988 Paravaigal Palavitham as Geetha
 1989 Thiruppu Munai as Chidambaram's wife
 1989 En Arumai Manaivi
 1990 Kavithai Paadum Alaigal
 1990 Vaazhkai Chakkaram as Thaaiyamma
 1990 Pudhiya Sarithiram 
 1991 Idhaya Vaasal as Vaani's sister
 1992 Thalaivasal as Saradha
 1992 Annan Ennada Thambi Ennada
 1992 Thangarasu
 1992 Chinna Thayee as Raasamma
 1993 Naalai Engal Kalyanam
 1993 Thangakkili
 1993 Madurai Meenakshi as Gomathi
 1993 Ulle Veliye as Rajalakshmi
 1993 Amaravathi as Arjun's aunty
 1993 Chinna Jameen as Amsaveni
 1994 Sakthivel as Chairman's wife
 1994 Thozhar Pandian as  Shanmuganathan's wife
 1994 Veera Padhakkam as Mani's wife
 1994 Manju Virattu as Chellamma
 1994 Seeman as Meenakshi
 1995 Aakaya Pookal
 1995 Chandralekha as Fathima
 1995 Paattu Padava as Janaki 
 1996 Parambarai 
 1996 Kadhal Kottai as Malliga
 1996 Poomani as Panchavarnam
 1997 Vallal as Selvi
 1997 Samrat as Samrat's mother
 1997 Mappillai Gounder as Shenbagam 
 1998 Moovendhar as Vaidehi's sister
 1998 Pudhumai Pithan as Bhavani
 1999 Kanave Kalaiyadhe as Manager's wife
 1999  Time as Dilip's mother
 2000 Ninaivellam Nee
 2000 Vaanathaippola as Janaki
 2000 Good Luck as Sr. Mary
 2000 Veeranadai
 2000 Maayi as Maayi's mother
 2000 Seenu as Janaki
 2001 Vaanchinathan as Abdul Khader's wife
 2001 Azhagana Naatkal as Guna's wife
 2002 Bala as Bhagyam
 2002 Samasthanam as Parama's wife
 2002 King
 2002 En Mana Vaanil  as  Ganesh's mother
 2002 Punnagai Desam as Ganesh's mother
 2002 Sundhara Travels as Gayathri's mother
 2003 Paarai as Durairaj's mother
 2003 Alaudin as Mallika
 2004 Ramakrishna
 2004 Engal Anna as  Easwaramurthy's wife 
 2004 Sound Party as Sarasu
 2004 Chatrapathi
 2004 Amma Appa Chellam as Velamma
 2004 Meesai Madhavan as Amminiamma
 2005 Oru Kadhal Seiveer
 2005 Selvam as Selvam's mother
 2006 Ilakkanam  as Murugavel's wife
 2006 Nagareega Komali as Gopi's mother
 2006 Kusthi
 2006 Aattam as Meenatchi
 2006 Sasanam
 2006 E
 2006 Vathiyar
 2007 Lee
 2007 Ippadikku En Kadhal
 2007 Piragu as Sathya's mother
 2007 Vasantham Vanthachu as Chellamma
 2007 Thiru Ranga as Doctor
 2008 Nayagan
 2008 Madurai Ponnu Chennai Paiyan as Meenakshi
 2008 Thithikkum Ilamai as Kalyani
 2008 Vambu Sandai as Lakshmi
 2008 Thotta as Nalina's mother
 2009 Vedappan as Deepika's mother
 2010 Kanagavel Kaaka
 2010 Neethana Avan as Meenakshi
 2010 Ithanai Naalai Engirunthai
 2011 Marudhavelu
 2012 Mahaan Kanakku
 2012 Mittu - Short film
 2013 Sandhithathum Sindhithathum	
 2015 Vettayadu
 2016 Thagadu
 2016 Thiraikku Varadha Kathai as Sophia's mother
 2017 Saaya as Bharath's mother
 2017 Keikraan Meikkiran as Madhu's mother
 2021 V

Telugu
 2008 Lakshmi Putrudu as Lakshmi

Television

References

http://www.malayalamcinema.com/star-details.php?member_id=451

External links

Sabitha Anand at MSI

Indian film actresses
Actresses from Kerala
Actresses in Malayalam cinema
20th-century Indian actresses
21st-century Indian actresses
Actresses in Tamil cinema
Actresses in Telugu cinema
Actresses in Kannada cinema
Living people
Actresses in Malayalam television
Indian television actresses
Year of birth missing (living people)
Actresses in Tamil television